Herman Day Gould (January 16, 1799 – January 26, 1852) was a U.S. Representative from New York.

Biography
Born in Sharon, Connecticut, Gould pursued an academic course.  He engaged in mercantile pursuits in Kingston, and Delhi, New York.  He married Ann Eliza Sherwood, the daughter of Samuel Sherwood, and they had four children.

Gould served as president of the Delhi National Bank from 1839 to 1849.

He was an unsuccessful candidate for election in 1840 to the Twenty-seventh Congress and in 1844 to the Twenty-ninth Congress.

Gould was elected as a Whig to the Thirty-first Congress (March 4, 1849 – March 3, 1851).
He was not a candidate for renomination in 1850.

Gould resumed business interests in Delhi, New York, and died there January 26, 1852. He was interred in Woodland Cemetery.  Gould had served as Vice President of the Woodland Cemetery Association.

References

1799 births
1852 deaths
People from Sharon, Connecticut
People from Delhi, New York
American bank presidents
Whig Party members of the United States House of Representatives from New York (state)
19th-century American politicians
Burials in New York (state)
19th-century American businesspeople